Emma Eleonora (Esmé) Wiegman-van Meppelen Scheppink (born 24 July 1975 in Haarlem) is a former Dutch politician. As a member of the ChristianUnion (ChristenUnie) she was an MP from 1 March 2007 to 19 September 2012. She focused on matters of the European Union, public health, welfare, sports, spatial planning and natural environment.

Wiegman studied Dutch language and Dutch literature with a specialization in modern Dutch and Dutch East Indies literature at Leiden University. After finishing her study she worked as an editor for publishers and a magazine.

Wiegman became an active member of the youth organisation of the Reformatory Political Federation (RPF) in 1989, later she became a board member of the RPF itself. After the RPF merged into the ChristianUnion in 2002, Wiegman was elected a local representative in the council of her hometown Zwolle.

In the 2007 national elections she was elected first runner-up for the lower house of Netherlands' Parliament. After the ChristianUnion became a participant in the newly formed fourth Balkenende cabinet - and two representatives taking positions in that cabinet - Wiegman became a member of Parliament in March 2007. Her term ended in September 2012.

Esmé Wiegman is married, mother of three and a member of the Protestant Church in the Netherlands.

References 
  Parlement.com biography

1975 births
Living people
Christian Union (Netherlands) politicians
Leiden University alumni
Members of the House of Representatives (Netherlands)
Municipal councillors of Zwolle
Politicians from Haarlem
Protestant Church Christians from the Netherlands
Reformatory Political Federation politicians
21st-century Dutch politicians
21st-century Dutch women politicians